L-3 Combat Propulsion Systems, a division of L-3, was formerly a division of General Dynamics Land Systems until L-3 acquired it in 2005. It is located in Muskegon, Michigan. L-3 Combat Propulsion Systems employs over 500 people and was the 4th largest employer in Muskegon County as of 2006.

The company's primary business is in building engines and transmissions. L-3 CPS builds or supplies
 The AVDS-1790 - 12 Cylinder turbocharged diesel engine 
 MTU MT883 1500 hp diesel engine
 HMPT-500 Hydromechanical transmission for the Bradley Fighting Vehicle

The current facility was home to Continental Motors near the turn of the century, Teledyne, Ryan Aeronautical Company, and General Dynamics Land Systems.

Notes

References 
Muskegon Growth

External links
Muskegon First Article
Military Today
Business week
1-3.com

Companies based in Michigan
L3Harris Technologies